Volleyball competitions at the 2023 Pan American Games in Santiago, Chile are scheduled to be held from October 21 to November 4. The venue for the competition is the Centro deportivo de vóleibol.

Each tournament will feature eight men's teams and eight women's teams, each with a maximum of 12 athletes. This indicates that 192 athletes will compete in total.

Qualification
A total of eight men's teams and eight women's team will qualify to compete at the games in each tournament. The host nation (Chile) received automatic qualification in both tournaments. All other teams qualified through various tournaments.

Men

Women

Participating nations
Eight countries have qualified volleyball teams so far. The numbers of participants qualified are in parentheses.

Medal summary

Medalists

References

Volleyball
Volleyball
2023 in volleyball
International volleyball competitions hosted by Peru